Negevirus is a taxon of non segmented, positive sense single stranded RNA viruses that have been isolated from mosquitoes and phlebotomine sand flies in Africa, the Americas, Asia and Europe. With the electron microscope the viruses appear to be spherical particles 45 to 55 nanometers in diameter.

Taxonomy

There are at least 91 viruses recognised in this taxon.

Genome

The viral genomes are between 7.039 and 10.054 nucleotides in length. There are three open reading frames (ORFs). The largest open reading frame lies toward the 5' end of the genome and encodes a polyprotein. This polyprotein has methyl transferase, viral helicase and RNA dependent RNA polymerase domains. There are untranslated regions at the 5' and 3' ends of the genome. These vary with the 5' end being between 72 and 730 and the 3' end 121 to 442 nucleotides in length. The function of the two smaller open reading frames is not known but they appear to be envelope proteins.

History

This taxon was first described in 2013.

References

RNA viruses
Unaccepted virus taxa